The TAP Boyz (an acronym for The Arabian Posse, sometimes Tall Arabian Posse), is a Chicago-based Arab American street gang or self-described "movement" formed on the corner of West 63rd Street and South Kedzie Avenue in 1992. They disbanded in 1999 after losing members to Gangster Two-Six and Almighty Ambrose in the area.

It was formed in response to anti-Arab sentiment from rival gangs. The movement's goal was to protect the Arab-American community from racially motivated assaults precipitated by the Gulf War. Their gang colors are white and red and their gang symbol is a four pointed star, though they occasionally use a moon and crescent to represent allegiance to Islam, which most members practice.

References

Organizations established in 1992
1992 establishments in Illinois
Organizations disestablished in 2001
2001 disestablishments in Illinois
Arab-American culture in Chicago
Arab-American gangs
Former gangs in Chicago
Palestinian-American culture
Syrian-American culture